Burj (tower, derived from either Middle Persian "burg" or Greek loan-word "pyrgos") may refer to:

Places

India
Burj Kaila, a village in Jalandhar district, Punjab, India
Burj Pukhta, a village in Jalandhar district, Punjab, India

Iran
Burj, Markazi, a village in Shazand County, Markazi Province
Borj-e Mohammadan or Burj, a village in Zirkuh County, South Khorasan Province
Burj-i-Qanat, a village in Sarbisheh County, South Khorasan Province

Israel/Palestine
al-Burj, Hebron, a Palestinian village in Hebron Governorate
al-Burj, Ramle, a Palestinian village in the Ramle Subdistrict, depopulated in 1948
Khirbat Al-Burj, a depopulated Palestinian village in the Haifa Subdistrict and archeological site
Khirbat Umm Burj, a Palestinian village in the Hebron Subdistrict, depopulated in 1948

Lebanon
Bourj Hammoud, a suburb of northeast Beirut
Burj el-Shemali, a Palestinian refugee camp near Tyre

Pakistan
Burj Attari, a town in the Punjab province of Pakistan
Burj Jeway Khan, a town in the Punjab province of Pakistan
Burj Mandi, a village in the Punjab province of Pakistan

Syria
 al-Burj, al-Bab, a village in Aleppo Governorate
 al-Burj, Idlib, a village in Idlib Governorate
Burj Islam, a village in the Latakia Governorate
Burj Qa'i, a village in Homs Governorate

Buildings

Dubai, United Arab Emirates

Burj Al Alam, Dubai, a planned skyscraper cancelled in 2013
Burj Al Arab, Dubai, the world's fourth-tallest hotel
Burj Al Fattan, Dubai, a planned skyscraper
Burj Jumeirah, Dubai, a planned skyscraper 
Burj Khalifa, Dubai, the world's tallest building
Burj al-Taqa, Dubai, an abandoned planned skyscraper
Uptown Dubai Tower 1, Dubai, originally Burj 2020, a planned skyscraper 
Nakheel Tower, Dubai, originally Al Burj, a planned skyscraper cancelled in 2009

Other cities
Al Burj (Amman), a commercial building in Amman, Jordan
Burj Doha, a skyscraper in Doha, Qatar
Burj Al Anoud, a skyscraper in Riyadh, Saudi Arabia
Burj Rafal, a hotel and residential building in Riyadh, Saudi Arabia
Fateh Burj, a Tower in Chappar Chiri village of Punjab, India
Musamman Burj, an octagonal tower in Agra Fort, Uttar Pradesh, India

Organizations
Burj Al Luq Luq, an independent organisation in Jerusalem

See also
Burg (disambiguation)
Berg (disambiguation)
Borj (disambiguation)
Burji (disambiguation)